The 2013 YouTube Music Awards, abbreviated as the YTMA, was the inaugural music award show presented by YouTube. The inaugural award show was held on November 3, 2013, streamed live from Pier 36 in New York City, with additional shows in Seoul, Moscow, Rio de Janeiro, and London.

Unlike other award shows, the winners were entirely voted on by fans. The show was directed by Spike Jonze."None of us have done anything live before or an awards show – in a way we're all like amateurs on YouTube ourselves, making our first video. So even if it's messy, it'll be live," Jonze admitted to Billboard.com.

Announcement and promotion
On September 30, 2013, YouTube uploaded Announcing the first-ever YouTube Music Awards, on its own channel. The video revealed that the award show would be presented by Kia. Several of the nominees, such as Epic Rap Battles of History and Eminem promoted their videos, in hopes they would win. Innovation of the Year nominee, DeStorm Power, also made a video asking his fans to vote for him stating, "Let's bring one home, and keep it in the family," referring to the fact that he is considered a homegrown YouTube musician. Kia served as the event's main sponsor.

Live performances & streaming
The award show featured live performances in the form of music videos from music industry stars such as Lady Gaga, Eminem, Arcade Fire, and Avicii. The award show was live streamed on YouTube's official channel.

Nominees
On Monday, October 21, 2013, YouTube announced the nominees for the six categories of its inaugural music award show. The nominees are based on video views, likes, comments, and subscriptions since September 2012. However, YouTube has not yet published the final stats results on the votes.
Girls' Generation won the Video of the Year with "I Got a Boy".

Video of the Year
Video of the Year recognizes the video with most fan engagement based on views, likes, shares, and comments.

 Girls' Generation — "I Got a Boy"

Artist of the Year
Artist of the Year recognizes the most watched, shared, liked, and subscribed-to artists.

 Eminem
 Epic Rap Battles of History
 Justin Bieber
 Katy Perry
 Macklemore & Ryan Lewis
 Nicki Minaj
 One Direction
 PSY
 Rihanna
 Taylor Swift

Response of the Year
Response of the Year recognizes the best fan remixes, covers or parodies, based on views, likes, shares, and comments.

 Lindsey Stirling and Pentatonix – "Radioactive"

YouTube Phenomenon
Recognizing the songs that generated the most fan videos.

 "I Knew You Were Trouble"
 "Diamonds"
 "Gangnam Style"
 "Harlem Shake"
 "Thrift Shop"

YouTube Breakthrough
Recognizing the artists with the greatest growth in views and subscribers.

 Macklemore & Ryan Lewis
 Kendrick Lamar
 Naughty Boy
 Passenger
 Rudimental

Innovation of the Year
Innovation of the Year recognizes creative video innovations with the most views, likes, shares and comments.

 DeStorm – "See Me Standing"

Reception
The show was documented for being unusual compared to other award shows, as well as having moments of awkward pauses and brief technical difficulties. Eminem's victory of Artist of the Year was, perhaps, the pinnacle of the feeling that the YouTube Music Awards' nominees were puzzling. This is because a frequent criticism was that being the YouTube Music Awards, homegrown YouTube musicians should have been more frequently nominated than they were.  The Los Angeles Times stated, "He is hardly a YouTube sensation in the traditional sense. He's more of an MTV kind of guy. Shouldn't YouTube try harder to honor its own?", referring to Eminem and his victory at the YTMAs.
Attendee and performer Tyler, the Creator, was also critical of the awards, noting the mainstream artist presence rather than independent YouTube musicians.
Yahoo! News stated, "The 90-minute affair may have split the Internet audience down the middle, judging by comments posted on Twitter, in which some people complained of censorship, when the show's live stream stopped several times." YouTube disabling comments on the video of the award show was also heavily criticized by fans.

Additionally, Girls' Generation, the Video of the Year's winner, received a considerable amount of negative backlash on Twitter from fans of the other candidates. Another winner, DeStorm, had his name mispronounced by hosts as he accepted his award. This was used as an example in a common criticism of the ceremony, which was that YouTube pushed its own content creators aside in favor of more traditional celebrities.

References

External links

YouTube Music Awards
YouTube Music Awards
YouTube Music Awards
YouTube
2013 awards in the United States
November 2013 events in the United States
2013 in Internet culture